Tavia Yeung Sin-yiu (born 30 August 1979), previously known as Tavia Yeung Yi, is a Hong Kong actress.  She is best known for starring in the television dramas Vigilante Force (2003), Moonlight Resonance (2008), Beyond the Realm of Conscience (2009), The Mysteries of Love (2010),  The Hippocratic Crush (2012) and Silver Spoon, Sterling Shackles (2012).

After graduating from acting classes at broadcasting giant TVB in 1999, Yeung began acting in music videos and made appearances as an extra in television dramas. In 2003, Yeung gained recognition for her supporting role in the drama Vigilante Force, winning the TVB Anniversary Award for Most Improved Female Artiste. In the next few years, she starred in dramas including Twin of Brothers (2004), Land of Wealth (2006) and Dicey Business (2007).

In 2008, Yeung gained widespread recognition for her role as Suen Ho Yuet in the modern drama Moonlight Resonance, winning the TVB Anniversary Award for Best Supporting Actress. With her role as the scheming Consort Lai in Beyond the Realm of Conscience, Yeung won the 2009 TVB Anniversary Award for My Favourite Female Character. In 2012, she was awarded TVB Anniversary Award for Best Actress for her performance in the drama Silver Spoon, Sterling Shackles, becoming the only TVB actress to have won all four individual TVB awards.

Career

1999–2007: Early work and rising popularity 
Having graduated from the 13th TVB Artistes Training Course in 1999, Yeung acted in several music videos and first played an extra in Justice Sung II. She played several bit roles in series such as Street Fighters (2000) and When Dreams Come True (2000). Yeung's first major role came as Suen Hing Yan in The Awakening Story (2001), in which she portrayed the younger sister of main lead Maggie Cheung. She played a supporting role in Eternal Happiness, a drama based on the Qing dynasty novel of the same name.

In 2003, Yeung's breakthrough role came as the rebellious single mother Kelly in Vigilante Force. She was awarded Most Improved Female Artiste at that year's TVB Anniversary Awards. In 2004, Yeung was cast as the female lead in historical costume drama The Vigilante in the Mask, starring alongside Deric Wan. Yeung's popularity surged with the airing of Twin of Brothers, starring alongside Raymond Lam and Ron Ng. Yeung continued to be highly promoted in the coming years, starring in The Academy, Yummy Yummy, and Land of Wealth. In 2007, Yeung cast off her "girl-next-door" image in Dicey Business, taking on the role of a materialistic waitress who decides to get breast implants. Yeung starred in the blockbuster drama Heart of Greed, solidifying her status as a rising star.

2008–2012: Critical success 
In 2008, Yeung starred in the Heart of Greed spin-off, Moonlight Resonance. Her portrayal as Suen Ho Yuet earned critical acclaim and the Best Supporting Actress award at the TVB Anniversary Awards.

At the 2009 TVB Sales Presentation, it was confirmed that Yeung would be starring in the historical drama Beyond the Realm of Conscience, starring alongside Moses Chan, Charmaine Sheh, and Kevin Cheng. It was Yeung's first villainous role as the scheming Yiu Kam Ling (Consort Lai). The drama series was a huge success, becoming the most-viewed TVB series of 2009. Yeung was nominated for Best Actress at the TVB Anniversary Awards but lost to veteran Sheren Tang. At the same awards ceremony, she won My Favourite Female Character for Yiu Kam Ling and Best Performance of the Year.

In 2010, Yeung starred in the romance drama The Mysteries of Love, playing the role of Tsui Siu Lai, a police officer who falls in love with professor King (played by Raymond Lam). The series was well received, and Yeung was once again nominated for Best Actress at the annual TVB Awards. In 2011, Yeung starred in four TVB productions: The Rippling Blossom, Yes Sir, Sorry Sir!, The Other Truth, and Men With No Shadows.

In January 2011, Yeung began filming for historical palace drama The Emperor's Harem, starring alongside Ady An and William Feng. Yeung took on the role of the evil and conniving Imperial Consort Wan. The drama marks her Chinese television series debut. In March 2011, Yeung began filming the historical drama Three Kingdoms RPG. After filming wrapped in July, she was cast in the medical drama The Hippocratic Crush, taking on the role of Dr. Fan. The drama premiered on February 13, 2012, and received overwhelming success. For her role as Dr. Fan, Yeung was awarded Astro On Demand's My Favourite TVB Awards for Best Actress In a Leading Role. She also won My Favorite TV Character and My Favorite On-Screen Couple with co-star Kenneth Ma. She was nominated for My Favorite Female Character at the TVB Awards. In November, Yeung starred in the period drama Silver Spoon, Sterling Shackles, playing Peking opera singer Hong Tse Kwan, a feminist, who becomes the wife of patriarch Sir Arthur Chung (played by Damian Lau). On December 17, 2012, Yeung won the TVB Anniversary Award for Best Actress, becoming the only actress to have won in all four major individual categories at the TVB Anniversary Awards, winning Most Improved Female Artiste (2003), Best Supporting Actress (2008), My Favourite Female Character (2009), and Best Actress (2012).

2013–present: Theatre debut 
After winning TV queen in 2012, Yeung continued to take on lead roles in TVB productions, including reprising her role as Dr. Fan in The Hippocratic Crush II (2013). She starred in the period drama Storm in A Cocoon (2014). In May 2014, Yeung started filming for Eye in the Sky, a crime thriller in which Yeung portrays a private investigator with eidetic memory. For her role, Yeung was nominated for My Favourite TVB Actress and My Favourite TVB Female TV Character at the 2015 Starhub TVB Awards, winning the latter. After filming completed for the 2015 martial arts drama Wudang Rules in October 2014, Yeung took on her next filming project, Momentary Lapse of Reason, a period drama set in 1930s Hong Kong. In May 2015, Yeung started filming for the historical drama The Last Healer in Forbidden City, starring opposite Roger Kwok. Yeung's contract with TVB ended in April 2016, and she confirmed that she would not be renewing her contract with the television network.

Yeung made her theatre debut in the stage play I Have a Date with Spring, premiering in Shanghai in January 2017.  That same year she starred in the comedy stage play Oh My X 72 Tenants. In 2018, Yeung reunited with Roger Kwok as on-screen partners in the drama series Another Era. Yeung portrays Hayley, the calculative wife of Leo, a business magnate. A co-production between TVB, iQiyi, and China Broadcast Film & Television Publishing House, the series first premiered on CCTV-8 and iQiyi on August 30. Despite poor viewership ratings, the series was praised for its strong cast and story. For her role as Hayley, Yeung was nominated for Best Actress at the 2018 TVB Anniversary Awards.

Personal life 

Yeung's older sister is actress Griselda Yeung. In 2011, Yeung began dating actor Him Law after filming The Hippocratic Crush. The couple married in October 2016, holding a wedding banquet at The Ritz Carlton.

On February 12, 2020, Yeung announced her pregnancy, and in the same year, she gave birth to a daughter on April 16. On October 26, 2020, Yeung announced on Instagram of her change of Chinese name from Yeung Yi to Yeung Sin-yiu. Her husband, Him Law, also changed his Chinese name with Yeung. In December 2021, she gave birth to a son.

Filmography

Film

Television series

Awards and achievements 

2003
 3 Weekly - Most Improved Female Artiste as "Kelly Wan" in Vigilante Force
 36th TVB Anniversary Awards - Most Improved Female Artiste as "Kelly Wan" in Vigilante Force

2007
 NEXT Magazine - WHY Best Fashion Style Award

2008
41st TVB Anniversary Awards - Best Supporting Actress as "Suen Ho Yuet" in Moonlight Resonance
Mingpao Newspaper 40th Anniversary Awards - Performance Power Award as "Suen Ho Yuet" in Moonlight Resonance

2009
Astro Wah Lai Toi's 5th Drama Awards – Favourite Character as “Tam Chu Mei” in Dicey Business
NEXT Magazine – Top 10 Favourite Artistes – Rank #3
42nd TVB Anniversary Awards – My Favourite Female Character as “Yiu Gam Ling” in Beyond the Realm of Conscience
42nd TVB Anniversary Awards – Best Performance of the Year

2010
Singapore's 1st StarHub TVB Awards – My Favourite TVB Female Character as “Suen Ho Yuet” in Moonlight Resonance
NEXT Magazine – PHILIPS Extraordinary Star Award
NEXT Magazine – Top 10 Favourite Artistes – Rank #4
Astro On Demand's My Favourite TVB Series Awards – Top 10 My Favourite TV Character as “Tsui Siu Lai” in The Mysteries of Love
Yahoo! Asia Buzz Awards – Most Searched TV Female Hong Kong Artiste

2011
NEXT Magazine – Top 10 Favourite Artistes – Rank #5
Singapore's 2nd StarHub TVB Awards – My Favourite TVB Female Character as “Tsui Siu Lai” in The Mysteries of Love
Fashion & Beauty's OL Most Loved Brand Spokesperson – Tavia Yeung for 2B Alternative
Next Magazine – Top 10 Healthy Image Hong Kong Star
Astro On Demand's My Favourite TVB Series Awards – Top 15 My Favourite TV Character as “Mavis Hong” in The Other Truth

2012
NEXT Magazine – Top 10 Favourite Artistes – Rank #8
Singapore's 3rd StarHub TVB Awards – My Favourite TVB Female Character as “Fan Chi Yu" in The Hippocratic Crush
Singapore's 3rd Starhub TVB Awards – Most Glamorous Female Artiste
Astro On Demand's My Favourite TVB Series Awards – Top 15 My Favourite TV Character as “Fan Chi Yu” in The Hippocratic Crush 
Astro On Demand's My Favourite TVB Series Awards – My Favourite On-Screen Couple (Kenneth Ma & Tavia Yeung) in The Hippocratic Crush 
Astro On Demand's My Favourite TVB Series Awards – My Favourite Actress in a Leading Role as “Fan Chi Yu” in The Hippocratic Crush
45th TVB Anniversary Awards – Best Actress as “Hong Tsz Kwan” in Silver Spoon, Sterling Shackles

2013
Shanghai Fashion Weekly Magazine's 3rd Annual Best Beauty Advisor Awards - Public Welfare Ambassador Award
Hong Kong Performing Arts Guild - Outstanding Performance By A Television Actress Award
NEXT Magazine – Top 10 Favourite Artistes – Rank #3
Prince Jewellery & Premier Cup Awards for The Best In Entertainment - The Best In Television Award
Singapore's 4th StarHub TVB Awards – My Favourite TVB Female Character as “Hong Tsz Kwan" in Silver Spoon, Sterling Shackles
Singapore's 4th Starhub TVB Awards – My Favourite TVB Actress
Astro TVB Star Awards 2013 - Top 15 My Favourite TVB Character as “Fan Chi Yu" in The Hippocratic Crush II
Astro TVB Star Awards 2013 - My Favourite TVB On-Screen Couple (Kenneth Ma & Tavia Yeung) in The Hippocratic Crush II
46th TVB Anniversary Awards - TVBC China's Most Popular TVB Female Artist

2014
Stars of Weibo 2013 - Weibo's Most Powerful Hong Kong TV Female Character (Tavia Yeung as “Fan Chi Yu" in The Hippocratic Crush II)

References

External links 
 

1979 births
Hong Kong film actresses
Hong Kong Mandopop singers
21st-century Hong Kong women singers
Hong Kong television actresses
Living people
TVB veteran actors
20th-century Hong Kong actresses
21st-century Hong Kong actresses